Drayton McLane Baseball Stadium at John H. Kobs Field is a college baseball stadium in East Lansing, Michigan.  The stadium holds roughly 4,600 people.  It is located on a floodplain on the inside of a bend in the Red Cedar River known traditionally as Old College Field (opened in 1902) and is the home field for the Michigan State University Spartans college baseball team.  The facility received a $4.3 million renovation in 2009.  The field itself is named after former MSU baseball coach John Kobs (named for him in 1969), and the stadium facility is named after former Houston Astros owner and Michigan State alumnus Drayton McLane Jr., whose donation in 2008 allowed for the renovation of the new facility.

The first official game in the newly renovated stadium was played on April 4, 2009. Spartan pitcher Nolan Moody threw a no-hitter against Northwestern University. It marked MSU's first no-hitter in 16 years.

In the summer of 2015, McLane Stadium at Kobs Field had a new electric field heating system installed by Sports Fields, Inc., becoming the first baseball field in the world with the state-of-the-art system.

The numbers of five former players have been honored by the Spartans and hang on the right field fence: No. 36 Robin Roberts, No. 30 Kirk Gibson, No. 10 Steve Garvey, No. 5 Tom Yewcic and No. 13 Mark Mulder.  Also honored are No. 25, worn by coach John Kobs and No. 1 worn by coach Danny Litwhiler.

High school and amateur baseball games also take place at Kobs Field. It was the largest baseball stadium in the Lansing area until the completion of Oldsmobile Park.

Prior to the 2005 renovation, seating at Kobs Field consisted of wooden bleachers with capacity of about 2,000, dating from shortly after World War II. Considerable open space outside the foul lines allowed standing room crowds in excess of 5,000 on isolated occasions.

See also
 List of NCAA Division I baseball venues

References

College baseball venues in the United States
Baseball venues in Michigan
Sports venues completed in 1902
Michigan State Spartans baseball
1902 establishments in Michigan